Jeannie Lynn "Jean" Fuller (née Guenther; born April 16, 1950) is an American educator and politician who served as the minority leader in the California State Senate. A Republican, she was previously a member of the California Assembly and the Superintendent of Schools for the Bakersfield City School District.

Background and education 
Jean Fuller was born and raised in Kern County. She received her AA degree from Bakersfield College in 1970, her BA from  California State University, Fresno in 1972, a Masters in Public Affairs from the  California State University, Los Angeles in 1982 and her PhD from the University of California, Santa Barbara in 1989. She supplemented her education with coursework and seminars at the University of Southern California, Harvard University, and Exeter College at Oxford University.

Career 
In 1983, Fuller became a School Principal/Director at Keppel Union School District, until 1988.

In 1988, Fuller became an Assistant Superintendent at Keppel Union School District. In 1990, Fuller became a Superintendent at Keppel Union School District, until 1999. In 1999, Fuller became a Superintendent at Bakersfield City School District, until 2006.

Fuller served as an educator in the Central Valley for more than 30 years.

Community involvement 
Fuller's professional and community leadership include the Kern County Museum Authority Board, the Boys & Girls Clubs of America, Jim Burke Education Leaders Forum, and the Kern County Superintendent's Administrative Advisory. Statewide leadership roles include the California School Boards Association, Association of School Administrators and the institute for Education Reform. Fuller was named California Superintendent of the Year by the American Association of School Administrators in the 2004/2005 school year. Fuller earned national recognition for school improvement in 1998 when she was awarded the AASA Leadership for Learning Award.

State politics 
First elected to the California State Legislature in 2006, Fuller represented the 32nd Assembly district, succeeding fellow Republican Kevin McCarthy, who was elected to Congress. Fuller went on to win election in California's 16th State Senate district in 2010. The 16th district includes parts of Kern, Tulare, and San Bernardino Counties as well as all of Inyo County, and is one of the largest in area in California.

In 2015, Senator Fuller authored SB 111, "Securing Federal Funding for Schools that Serve Military Families." SB 111, which was signed into law by Governor Jerry Brown, provides a 20% matching of funds for 11 California schools near or on a military base, allocating $61 million in federal and state funds.

In 2012, Fuller authored SB 1367, the "Archery Hunting/Firearms Bill." This bill revised the archery provisions of the Fish and Game code to authorize a peace officer to carry a firearm while hunting deer, while prohibiting use of that firearm to illegally hunt deer. SB 1367 was signed into law by Governor Jerry Brown.

Fuller was term-limited from seeking reelection in 2018.

References

External links

Join California Jean Fuller

1950 births
Living people
American Congregationalists
School superintendents in California
American school administrators
Bank of America
Republican Party California state senators
Republican Party members of the California State Assembly
Women state legislators in California
Politicians from Bakersfield, California
Alumni of Exeter College, Oxford
Bakersfield College alumni
California State University, Los Angeles alumni
Harvard University alumni
University of California, Santa Barbara alumni
University of Southern California alumni
California State University, Fresno alumni
21st-century American politicians
21st-century American women politicians